Mary Barclay's Mountain is a  summit located in the Kananaskis Range of the Canadian Rockies of Alberta, Canada. Mary Barclay's Mountain can be seen from Highway 40 in Kananaskis Country. The mountain's nearest higher neighbor is Skogan Peak,  to the west, and Mount Lorette is to the immediate southwest.


History
This summit honors Mary Belle Barclay (1912-1983), who founded the first of the Canadian Youth Hostels in 1933 at Bragg Creek near Calgary, Alberta. With her sister, Catherine, together they officially founded and registered the Canadian Youth Hostel Association in 1938.

Geology

Mary Barclay's Mountain is composed of sedimentary rock laid down during the Precambrian to Jurassic periods. Formed in shallow seas, this sedimentary rock was pushed east and over the top of younger rock during the Laramide orogeny.

Climate

Based on the Köppen climate classification, Mary Barclay's Mountain is located in a subarctic climate zone with cold, snowy winters, and mild summers. Temperatures can drop below −20 °C with wind chill factors below −30 °C. Precipitation runoff from the mountain drains into the Kananaskis River which is a tributary of the Bow River.

See also
Alberta's Rockies
List of mountains of Canada

References

Gallery

Two-thousanders of Alberta
Canadian Rockies
Alberta's Rockies